Trephionus niumontanus, is a species of beetle belonging to the family Carabidae. It is endemic to Japan.

Etymology
The specific name niumontanus is from Niu Mountains, where the type specimen was found.

Description
Body length of male is about 10.6 mm, whereas female is 10.9 mm. Dorsal surface black. Endophallus slender. No hind wings. Dorso-apical lobe narrowly swollen. Apex of aedeagus rounded.

References

Beetles described in 2018
Platyninae